Karol may refer to:

Places
 Karol, Gujarat, a village on Saurashtra peninsula in Gujarat, west India
 Karol State, a former Rajput petty princely state with seat in the above town

Film/TV
Karol: A Man Who Became Pope, a 2005 miniseries
Karol: The Pope, The Man, a 2006 miniseries

Other uses
Karol (name)
King Karol, a New York City-based record store chain

See also

Carol (disambiguation)
Kalol (disambiguation)
Karoli (disambiguation)
Karoo (disambiguation)
Karow (disambiguation)